Neo: The World Ends with You is an action role-playing game co-developed by Square Enix and h.a.n.d. and published by Square Enix. This game is a sequel to the 2007 video game The World Ends with You. It was released for the Nintendo Switch and PlayStation 4 in July 2021, and for Windows in September 2021. The story features a new cast of characters playing the Reapers' Game in Shibuya and, unlike the original game, now features three-dimensional graphics.

Concepts for a sequel to The World Ends with You had been attempted in the years following the original 2007 release, however none came to fruition for one reason or another. Returning staff for the game include Tatsuya Kando as series director, Tetsuya Nomura as creative producer and character designer, Gen Kobayashi as character designer, and Hiroyuki Itou, who was game designer in the original but now serves as director. Takeharu Ishimoto, the composer for the original game, though no longer a full time employee of Square Enix, confirmed that he had composed the music for the sequel.

Gameplay
Unlike the first title in the series, Neo is a fully 3D title. Players can control multiple characters at once during combat and attack opponents with "psych" abilities granted by items called "pins". Each character can equip one pin of the over 300 available, and different pin groupings can create combination attacks. Each pin is assigned to a single button and requires a different input. Wearable "threads" also give a boost to the player characters' abilities. Common game enemies are called "Noise", which are negative emotions that have come to life. The scanning ability the player uses to search for these enemies allows the player to read characters' thoughts.

Leveling up grants the player characters bonus HP; other stats can be upgraded by ordering meals at restaurants in-game, though the player characters can only eat when they are hungry, depicted by a battery meter that depletes after each fight. As the player interacts with more people throughout the story, their "Social Network" expands, allowing them to spend acquired Friendship Points on upgrades such as exclusive shop and food items, expanded pin capacity, and assigning multiple pins to the same button in combat.

Outside of combat, characters can use their abilities to assist people and explore the city - for example, Fret's "Remind" ability will remind all NPCs in an area about a particular topic, and Shoka's "Telewarp" lets the group teleport to previously inaccessible areas. More of these abilities are acquired by progressing through the story. Previous days can be revisited at any time in order to access previously incomplete side missions.

Synopsis

Setting 
The game takes place in a recreated and stylized version of the Shibuya district in Tokyo, Japan. Unlike the first game's depiction of Shibuya, places such as Tower Records and Parco keep their names instead of using different ones such as Towa Records and Molco. As with the anime adaptation, some of the elements of the game had been modernized for the sequel, such as the use of smartphones rather than earlier flip-style cell phones and the appearance of the game's 104 building matches the current appearance of the real-life Shibuya 109 building.

Characters 
The main protagonist and playable character is Rindo Kanade (奏 竜胆, Kanade Rindō), a high school student and a Player in the Reapers' Game. In the Game, he is partnered with his friend and classmate Tosai Furesawa (觸澤 桃斎,	Furesawa Tōsai (nicknamed "Fret" (フレット, Furetto)) and a gaming otaku college student named Nagi Usui (笛吹 梛, Usui Nagi). They make up a team of Players called the Wicked Twisters, with Rindo as the de facto leader. Each character has a unique ability in the Reapers' Game that comes into play during gameplay: Rindo can change the past with "Replay", Fret can remind people of things they've forgotten with "Remind", and Nagi can go into people's minds with "Dive". The team is also joined by the returning former Reaper/antagonist from the first game, Sho Minamimoto (南師 猩, Minamimoto Shō).

Rindo and his friends compete against rival teams who are the Ruinbringers, the top team in the Reapers' Game which includes Kaichi Susuki (周々木 鹿ー, Susuki Kaichi (nicknamed "Susukichi" (ススキチ Susukichi)) and Tsugumi Matsunae (松苗 亜実, Matsunae Tsugumi), the latter of whom returns from the first game's Solo Remix and Final Remix re-releases, the Deep Rivers Society, a group of river enthusiasts led by Fuya Kawahara (河原 封也, Kawahara Fuuya), the Variabeauties, a group of super stylists led by Kanon Tachibana (立花 果遠, Tachibana Kanon), and the Purehearts, a group of savvy social media influencers led by Motoi Anazawa (モトイ, Anazawa Motoi). Reapers are split into two distinct groups: the Shibuya Reapers which first appeared in the original game, and Shinjuku Reapers which are completely new. Shinjuku Reapers include Shiba Miyakaze (三谷風 椎葉, Miyakaze Shiiba), the Game Master in the Reapers' Game, Tanzo Kubo (久網 旦蔵, Kubō Tanzō), Ayano Kamachi (蒲池 菖乃 Kamachi Ayano), Kaie Ono (小野 解依, Ono Kaie), Hishima Sazakuchi (坂筑 菱真, Sazakuchi Hishima) and Shoka Sakurane (桜音 紫陽花, Sakurane Shōka). Shibuya Reapers returning from the first game are antagonists Koki Kariya (狩谷 拘輝, Kariya Kōki), Uzuki Yashiro (八代 卯月, Yashiro Uzuki), and Coco Atarashi (新 子々, Atarashi Koko), the last of whom returns from the first's game's Solo Remix followed by LIVE Remix and finally Final Remix.

Rindo is also supported by Swallow (スワロウさん, Suwarou-san), his online friend and a mysterious individual that he communicates with through a social media game and text messages. Swallow's identity is an ongoing mystery Rindo attempts to uncover throughout the game, only revealed after the story's climax. A number of protagonists from the first game also make appearances throughout to support the new cast.

Plot
High schoolers Rindo Kanade and Tosai "Fret" Furesawa are unexpectedly drawn into the "Reapers' Game", a competition for the recently deceased in which they must battle other teams over the course of a week for their survival. The two form a team called the "Wicked Twisters" and recruit former Reaper Sho Minamimoto and college student Nagi Usui in order to survive. Overseen by Game Master Shiba Miyakaze and several of his subordinates, including Tanzo Kubo and Shoka Sakurane, the group does battle with the other teams and clashes with the Ruinbringers, a powerful team consisting of Kaichi "Susukichi" Susuki and Tsugumi Matsunae, who have won every preceding game and keep choosing to re-enter the next round, thereby trapping the other teams in a never-ending series of game loops. During this time, Rindo discovers he has the ability to rewind time. At the end of the week, the Wicked Twisters battle Susukichi, but are nearly defeated. They are rescued by a masked man presumed to be legendary former Player Neku Sakuraba. Shiba declares the Ruinbringers victorious and erases the last place team, the Reaper's Game is extended another week, and Minamimoto deserts the group.

During the second week, the Wicked Twisters recruit "Neku", revealed to be former Player Daisukenojo "Beat" Bito. They learn that Shiba and his Reapers hail from Shinjuku, which was erased in an event known as Inversion; they plan to do the same to Shibuya. They also learn that Shiba has been using Player Pins to pull living Players into the Reaper's Game, including Rindo, Fret, Nagi and Beat. Shoka defects to the Wicked Twisters near the end of the week after the Reapers learn she was secretly helping the Wicked Twisters, and Shiba subsequently reveals that he is the leader of the Ruinbringers and that Susukichi and Tsugumi are Reapers; he declares victory in the second week and challenges the Wicked Twisters to face him in one last game with Shibuya at stake.

Over the course of the third week, the Wicked Twisters do battle with Shiba's Plague Noise, which can erode the barrier between reality and the afterlife. Due to their aggressive mind-consuming behavior spreading in both planes, victims of those attacked have their psyche warped in different ways, ranging from total apathy dubbed “Shibuya Syndrome” among the living, to more severe cases of aggression as well as amnesia among Players. Minamimoto returns and challenges the group to a fight; they are rescued by the real Neku, who explains that Reaper Coco Atarashi orchestrated his second death in a futile attempt to save Shinjuku from erasure, and that they have since been investigating the incident in the hopes of protecting Shibuya. Coco reveals that Tsugumi is the lone survivor of Shinjuku's erasure and that her soul has been sealed in a stuffed Mr. Mew, revealed to be the original Mr. Mew that Shiki made; the group uses their powers to talk with her and learn that she has been sending visions of the future to Neku and Rindo to try to avert Shibuya's erasure. 

The Wicked Twisters battle and erase Shiba, but are confronted by Kubo. Kubo reveals that he has been masquerading as one of Shiba's Reaper subordinates but is in fact an Angel who gave Shiba his powers over Plague Noise and is the true mastermind behind the erasure of Shinjuku. He also gave Rindo his time-traveling powers via his Player Pin, which absorbs the lost thoughts of the timelines he leaves behind in order to fuel a swarm of Noise that Kubo releases to destroy Shibuya. The Wicked Twisters battle Kubo, but all save Rindo are erased before Kubo is annihilated from reality by Shinjuku's Composer, Hazuki "Haz" Mikagi.

Shibuya is saved and Rindo finds himself back in the real world, but all of his teammates have been erased from reality. Haz offers Rindo the chance to go back in time once more to save his friends, although doing so will once again put the city at risk of being destroyed by Kubo's Noise. Rindo rallies all of the survivors and with the help of his friends, overwrites the lost thoughts with the thoughts of present-day Shibuya, which weakens Kubo's Noise swarm. The remaining Noise coalesce into a powerful Noise called Phoenix Cantus, which the Wicked Twisters destroy. In the aftermath, Rindo and his friends all return to reality along with Shoka, who is brought back to life by Yoshiya "Joshua" Kiryu, Shibuya's Composer; the repentant Shiba returns to Shinjuku along with the remaining Shinjuku Reapers to rebuild the city.

"Another Day"

After completing the main story, players can complete a series of quests that are separate from the main plot events, similar to the "Tin Pin" storyline in the first game. The story is based around the protagonists getting tickets to a concert by "The Death March", a band that performed some of the songs in the game. All playable characters from the main story are available to use. There are many variations of the boss battles from the main story including a Minamimoto challenge boss. After completing the storyline, players can listen to a live rendition of the song "Rockin' Rockin'" while viewing the credits.

Development and release 

The original The World Ends with You (TWEWY) had been developed by common team members and released around the same time as the Kingdom Hearts series. While the latter had more sales and recognition, the former had garnered a strong cult following as well as being a project of interest by creative producer and character designer Tetsuya Nomura and director Tatsuya Kando. However, much of the original's team were too involved in subsequent Kingdom Hearts games to focus on a follow up according to Kando. TWEWY remained of significant interest within Square Enix, which led to them collaborating with h.a.n.d. on a high-definition port for mobile devices via Solo Remix in 2012, and another port for the Nintendo Switch via Final Remix in 2018, the latter of which included a new chapter called "A New Day" with new characters. Final Remix was directed by Hiroyuki Itou and produced by Tomohiko Hirano, both of whom reprise their roles for Neo. According to Hirano, while the idea for a sequel had been on their minds for some time, "we needed to secure an environment where we could focus on this game, so that's why it took a little bit of time for us to deliver it to you".

Kando stated that while Neo is a sequel, they did not want to call it The World Ends with You 2, as there were many significantly new ideas in both gameplay and narrative, and were introducing new characters. Tetsuya Nomura stated that he had a lot of trouble with the title. He decided it just before the announcement. After much thinking, he decided to go with a nostalgic "新" (Shin; lit. New) title (Note: Japanese series tend to use Shin/New in their titles, especially sequels). However, Kando did state they wanted to address the loose ends from the original game, as well as from the "A New Day" scenario in Final Remix, but present it from the viewpoint of characters completely new to the Reapers' Game. Part of this includes the major shift from the dual-screen battle system used in the Nintendo DS game to a single-screen system. According to Itou, they wanted to make sure to retain the focus of teamwork of the DS battle system, and developed the new 3D-based battle system so that the player has control of all four members of the party at the same time, a concept that was explored during the development of Solo Remix.

Nomura returned to design the character art. For the lead character of Rindo, he was looking to provide some type of iconic item of clothing that would make him stand out and represent his isolated personality, similar to Neku's headphones in the original game. Prior to the COVID-19 pandemic, he had seen that face masks had become a popular fashion accessory for the youth of Japan and opted for that; he did not imagine that face masks would become a normal occurrence in the world by the time the game launched.

The game's world will still be based on an accurate representation of modern-day Shibuya, expanding maps into other areas of the district such as Harajuku. The game reflects the changes in Shibuya in the 14 years since the original game, such as renovations to Miyashita Park that were completed in 2020.

The game was revealed on November 23, 2020, after a week-long countdown on the game's official web page. The reveal coincided with the upload of the anime adaptation's second trailer. Nomura uploaded an illustration featuring series protagonists Neku and Rindo to the game's official Twitter account in celebration. Neo released for Nintendo Switch and PlayStation 4 on July 27, 2021, with a Windows version released on the Epic Games Store on September 28, 2021, followed by Steam on October 19, 2022.

Reception

Neo: The World Ends with You received "generally favorable" reviews for Nintendo Switch and PlayStation 4, according to review aggregator Metacritic. The game failed to meet the publisher's sales expectations.

Sales

Neo: The World Ends with You was the bestselling retail game during its first week of release in Japan, with 18,799 physical copies being sold.

Notes

References

External links 
 

2021 video games
Action role-playing video games
Fiction about death games
H.a.n.d. games
Japanese role-playing video games
Multiplayer and single-player video games
Nintendo Switch games
PlayStation 4 games
Shibuya
Single-player video games
Square Enix games
Ubisoft games
Urban fantasy video games
Video games developed in Japan
Video games scored by Takeharu Ishimoto
Video games set in Tokyo
Video game sequels
Video games with cel-shaded animation
Windows games
World War III video games